The 2nd Texas Partisan Rangers was a unit of mounted volunteers from Texas that fought in the Confederate States Army during the American Civil War. B. Warren Stone began organizing the unit at Dallas in October 1862 with the permission of Confederate States Secretary of War George W. Randolph. In March 1863, the regiment marched to Houston and the following month it traveled to Louisiana as part of James Patrick Major's brigade. Soon after, Stone was replaced as colonel by Isham Chisum. The regiment fought at Second Donaldsonville, Kock's Plantation, Sterling's Plantation, and Bayou Bourbeux. In 1863–1864, the unit wintered near Galveston. In 1864, the 2nd Partisan Rangers were in action at Mansfield, Pleasant Hill, Monett's Ferry, and Yellow Bayou during the Red River Campaign. The partisan rangers went back to Texas in December 1864 and usually camped at Houston until the surrender of the Trans-Mississippi Department on 26 May 1865.

See also
List of Texas Civil War Confederate units
Texas in the Civil War

Notes

References

 
 

 

Units and formations of the Confederate States Army from Texas
1862 establishments in Texas
1865 disestablishments in Texas
Military units and formations disestablished in 1865
Military units and formations established in 1862